Melani Putri (born 21 July 2000) is an Indonesian rower. She competed in the women's lightweight double sculls event at the 2020 Summer Olympics.

References

External links
 

2000 births
Living people
Indonesian female rowers
Olympic rowers of Indonesia
Rowers at the 2020 Summer Olympics
Rowers at the 2018 Asian Games
Asian Games competitors for Indonesia
People from Karawang Regency
Competitors at the 2021 Southeast Asian Games
Southeast Asian Games medalists in rowing
Southeast Asian Games silver medalists for Indonesia
21st-century Indonesian women